Gerhard Fischer (12 July 1890 – 10 September 1977) was a Norwegian architect and archaeologist.

Biography
Johan Adolf Gerhard Fischer was born in Bergen, Norway. He was the son of architect Adolph Fischer (1844–1925) and Dorothea Margaretha Elisabeth Wilcken (1857–1943). Fischer studied at the Bergen Technical School (Bergens Tekniske Skole), the Norwegian National Academy of Craft and Art Industry (Statens håndverks- og kunstindustriskole) in Oslo  and the Royal Danish Academy of Fine Arts (Det Kongelige Danske Kunstakademi) in Copenhagen.

From 1916 to 1926 he was employed by the Norwegian State Railways  architectural office. During that period, he designed the Lillestrøm Station, Notodden Station, Åneby Station, Ljan Station and Bekkelaget Station.

From 1938 until 1960, he was employed as a conservator at Universitetets Oldsaksamling,  now part of Museum of Cultural History in Oslo. He chaired several excavations of sites dating from the Middle Ages in Norway  including  Sverresborg in Trondheim  and the Bergenhus Fortress in Bergen. He was also associated with  archeological excavations at Utstein Abbey, Hovedøya Abbey,  Tønsberg Fortress, Stavanger Cathedral, Nidarosdomen and the Archbishop's Palace in Trondheim.  He also led the final stage of excavation in Minneparken at Gamlebyen in Oslo.

His books include Oslo under Eikaberg from 1950, Norske kongeborger (two volumes, 1951 and posthumously 1980), Domkirken i Stavanger from 1964, Domkirken i Trondheim (1965), and Utstein kloster from 1965.

He was awarded the Medal of St. Hallvard in 1956, and was decorated Commander of the Order of St. Olav in 1965. He was an honorary member of the Society of Antiquaries of Scotland, and of the Society of Antiquaries of London.

Gallery

References

1890 births
1977 deaths
Architects from Bergen
Oslo National Academy of the Arts alumni
Royal Danish Academy of Fine Arts alumni
Archaeologists from Bergen
Recipients of the St. Olav's Medal
Fellows of the Society of Antiquaries of London
20th-century archaeologists